Ōyodo may refer to:
Ōyodo, Nara - town in Japan
Ōyodo River - a river in Kagoshima and Miyazaki prefectures, Japan
Japanese cruiser Ōyodo - World War II cruiser
 JDS Ōyodo, an Abukuma-class destroyer escort of the Japanese Maritime Self-Defense Force